Kashirskoye is a rural locality (a selo) and the administrative center of Kashirsky District of Voronezh Oblast, Russia. Population:

References

Notes

Sources

Rural localities in Kashirsky District, Voronezh Oblast